The 1928–29 Washington State Cougars men's basketball team represented Washington State College for the  college basketball season. Led by first-year head coach Jack Friel, the Cougars were members of the Pacific Coast Conference and played their home games on campus at WSC Gymnasium in Pullman, Washington.

Alumnus Friel was the head coach at North Central High School in Spokane, and won the state title in his third and final season at NCHS in 1928. A former team captain and all-conference player under Fred Bohler, Friel led Washington State as head coach for three decades.

References

External links
Sports Reference – Washington State Cougars: 1928–29 basketball season

Washington State Cougars men's basketball seasons
Washington State Cougars
Washington State
Washington State